"Sky Stays This Blue" is a song written by Ross Copperman, Ashley Gorley, and Josh Osborne and recorded by Canadian country singer Dallas Smith for his third studio album, Side Effects (2016). It was released to Canadian country radio May 16, 2017 through 604 Records as the album's fifth single. An accompanying video featuring Smith's daughter premiered on Father's Day 2017.

Commercial performance
"Sky Stays This Blue" debuted at number 41 on the Canada Country chart dated June 3, 2017. It earned Smith his record-extending sixteenth consecutive top ten single in its sixth week. The song has since peaked at number one on the chart dated August 26, 2017. This ascension made Smith the first Canadian male artist to earn four number one country singles, the first Canadian male artist to generate three number one country singles from one album (following "Autograph" and "Side Effects"), and the first Canadian country artist to post three consecutive number one country singles.

Music video
The music video for "Sky Stays This Blue" was directed by Stephano Barberis and stars Smith's three-year-old daughter Vayda. It was released June 18, 2017 as a Father's Day dedication to his children. Smith chose Barberis to direct the video as, in addition to having collaborated on nine of his previous videos, Barberis is Vayda's godfather. The video was promoted the week before its release via Smith's social media.

Charts

Year-end charts

Certifications

References

2016 songs
2017 singles
Dallas Smith songs
604 Records singles
Songs written by Ross Copperman
Songs written by Ashley Gorley
Songs written by Josh Osborne
Song recordings produced by Joey Moi
Music videos directed by Stephano Barberis